Khed Lok Sabha constituency was a Lok Sabha (parliamentary) constituency in Maharashtra state in western India until 2008.

Members of Parliament

See also
 Shirur Lok Sabha constituency
 Khed
 List of former constituencies of the Lok Sabha

References

Former Lok Sabha constituencies of Maharashtra
1957 establishments in Bombay State
Former constituencies of the Lok Sabha
2008 disestablishments in India
Constituencies disestablished in 2008